Donal O'Grady (born 3 July 1980) is an Irish hurler who played as a midfielder and later centre back for the Limerick senior team.

Born in Ballingarry, County Limerick, O'Grady first arrived on the inter-county scene at the age of twenty-one when he first linked up with the Limerick under-21 team. He made his senior debut in the 2004 championship. O'Grady has since gone on to play a key part for Limerick, and has won one Munster medal and one National League (Division 2) medal. O'Grady has been an All-Ireland runner-up on one occasion.

O'Grady has been a member of the Munster inter-provincial team on a number of occasions and has won two Railway Cup medals. At club level he won one intermediate championship medal with Granagh-Ballingarry.

He attended St Munchin's College, Limerick and graduated from there in 1998.

College :L.I.T

Playing career

Granagh-Ballingarry

O'Grady plays his club hurling with the Granagh-Ballingarry club and has enjoyed some success.

In 2005 the club enjoyed its greatest success, with O'Grady playing a key role. After losing at the quarter-final or semi-final stage for six years in a row, the club finally reached the final of the county intermediate championship. A 4-10 to 3-10 defeat of Glenroe gave O'Grady a championship medal.

Limerick

O'Grady first came to prominence on the inter-county scene as a member of the Limerick under-21 team in 2001. He started in Limerick's opening game against Cork but was substituted after half-an-hour and failed to regain his place on the team., In spite of this he claimed Munster and All-Ireland medals as a non-playing substitute.

In 2004 O'Grady made his senior debut when he came on as a blood sub in Limerick's 1-18 to 2-12 defeat by Cork in the Munster semi-final. He was the first man from the Granagh-Ballingarry club to play senior hurling for Limerick.

After becoming a regular member of the starting fifteen the following year, O'Grady lined out in his first Munster final in 2007. Waterford provided the opposition, however, a 3-17 to 1-14 defeat was Limerick's lot on that occasion. Limerick later gained their revenge on Waterford in the All-Ireland semi-final, thus gaining qualification to a first All-Ireland decider in eleven years for the Treaty men. Kilkenny provided the opposition and got off to a flying start with Eddie Brennan and Henry Shefflin combining to score two goals within the first ten minutes. Limerick were eventually defeated on a 2–19 to 1–15 score line.

Limerick failed to build on their reasonably successful 2007 season and went into decline once again.

In late 2009 and early 2010 Limerick hurling hit an all-time low when many of the senior hurling team withdrew their services in protest at the continuation of Justin McCarthy as manager. As a result of this O'Grady played no part in the 2010 championship.

O'Grady returned to the panel in 2011 and a new management team took over. Limerick defeated Clare by 4-12 to 2-13 in the National League Division 2 final that year, giving O'Grady his first success in the senior grade.

In 2013 O'Grady was appointed captain of the Limerick senior hurling team. It was a successful year as he won a Munster medal after guiding the team to a 0-24 to 0-15 victory over Cork in the final.

Munster

O'Grady has also lined out with Munster in a number of inter-provincial campaigns and has enjoyed some success.

In 2007 he was at midfield in his debut year when Munster defeated Connacht by 2-22 to 2-19 to take the Railway Cup title.  Further appearances for the province in 2008, 2009 and 2012 ended in defeat.

O'Grady won a second inter-provincial medal in 2013 following Munster's 1-22 to 0-15 defeat of Connacht.

Honours
Limerick

Limerick Senior Hurling Captain 2013-2015

Munster Senior Hurling Championship (1): 2013

Waterford Crystal Cup 2006 & 2015

NHL Div 2 League 2011

Railway Cup 2007 & 2013

All-Ireland U21 Hurling Championship 2001

References 

1980 births
Living people
Granagh-Ballingarry hurlers
Limerick inter-county hurlers
Munster inter-provincial hurlers
People educated at St Munchin's College
Hurling selectors